Carlos Rodrigues Corrêa (born 29 December 1980 in Limeira) is a professional Brazilian footballer who plays as a defensive midfielder for Capivariano.

Club career
As many other Brazilian players, Corrêa was introduced to football on the streets of his city. After playing in various junior clubs, he was noticed by the scouts of Brazilian giants Palmeiras. After several successful seasons in Brazil, Corrêa was transferred to Europe, as he was noticed by Ukrainian top-flight club, FC Dynamo Kyiv.

He debuted for Dynamo in summer of 2006. Carlos wears the number 7 for Dynamo. Scoring three goals in his first three domestic league games for Dynamo, he quickly earned a starting spot in the Ukrainian team. Following Dynamo's 2–0 victory over domestic rival Shaktar Donetsk in the Ukrainian Super Cup, Shaktar's head coach Mircea Lucescu stated on Corrêa's performance that he is "an unbelievable midfielder". In Ukraine Correa proved himself as a master of corner and free kicks, and regularly performs them for his club.

In 2008 Correa suffered serious injury and missed some of the 2008–09 season. At that time Dynamo had changes at coaching position and the new coach Valeriy Gazzayev could find a place on a team for the Brazilian playmaker. In 2009 Correa lost his place in the first team and soon was loaned out.

In June 2010 Corrêa signed with Flamengo, on loan, for the rest of 2010 season.

On 30 July 2012 it was announced Corrêa would have a trial with Middlesbrough FC after being recommended to manager Tony Mowbray by club legend Juninho Paulista.

On 21 December 2012, after being relegated with Palmeiras, Corrêa was announced as player of Portuguesa de Desportos.

International career
There were talks of possible naturalization of him to play for the Ukraine national football team.

Flamengo career statistics
(Correct )

according to combined sources on the Flamengo official website and Flaestatística.

Honours
Campeonato Paulista Série A2: 2013

Dynamo Kyiv
Ukrainian Super Cup (2): 2006, 2009

References

External links

1980 births
Living people
People from Limeira
Brazilian footballers
Brazilian expatriate footballers
Expatriate footballers in Ukraine
Campeonato Brasileiro Série A players
Sociedade Esportiva Palmeiras players
FC Dynamo Kyiv players
Clube Atlético Mineiro players
CR Flamengo footballers
Associação Portuguesa de Desportos players
Fortaleza Esporte Clube players
Ukrainian Premier League players
Brazilian expatriate sportspeople in Ukraine
Association football midfielders
Footballers from São Paulo (state)